The Ashi River is a right tributary of the Songhua in eastern Manchuria, in Harbin's Acheng District in the People's Republic of China.

Name
The river has borne the name "Ashi" since the Qing (17th–20th century). Before that, it was known as the Anchuhu (Middle Chinese: ʔan-tsyhwit-xu), a medieval Chinese transcription of its original Jurchen name Anchun, Ancun, or Alcun, meaning 'gold' or 'golden', presumably from placer deposits along its banks.

History

The river was the home to Huining (now Acheng), the original settlement of the Wanyan clan of the Jurchens. When their chief Aguda declared himself the successor of the Liao , he adopted the dynastic name Jin as a Chinese translation of the river's name. Huining—as Shangjing (the "Upper Capital")—served as the Jin capital until 1234 and later served as a subsidiary capital after 1173.

See also
 Rivers of China

Notes

References

Citations

Bibliography
 .
 .

Rivers of Heilongjiang
Songhua River